Pedro de Cordoba (September 28, 1881 – September 16, 1950) was an American actor.

Biography

De Cordoba was born in New York City to parents who were French and Cuban in origin. He was a classically trained theatre actor who confessed he did not enjoy appearing in silent films nearly as much as he liked working on stage, but his career during the silent film era was extensive. His first film was Cecil B. DeMille's version of Carmen (1915), and he soon became a regular leading man in Hollywood. His Broadway career cast him with such stage actresses as Jane Cowl and Katharine Cornell.

In the sound era, his deeply resonant speaking voice made him perfectly suited to talking pictures and was active as a character actor in Hollywood, from the mid-1930s through to the end of his life. He was most often cast as aristocratic, or clerical characters of Hispanic origin, as in The Keys of the Kingdom (1944), because of his last name as well as his royal bearing. On rare occasions, he would be cast in the role of a villain. His "living skeleton" sideshow character hides fugitive Robert Cummings (and Priscilla Lane) in his carnival wagon overnight in the Alfred Hitchcock film Saboteur (1942).

He was a devout Catholic and served for a time as president of the Catholic Actors Guild of America. The last film in which he appeared, a political drama set in an unnamed South American dictatorship, Crisis (1950), was released shortly after his death.

Selected filmography

Radio appearances

References

External links

 
 
  - entry #1
  - entry #2 (All Movie has disjointed entries)
 
 left to right: Gladys Hulette, Lionel Barrymore, Pedro de Cordoba in Enemies of Women (1923)
 nytimes.com – New York Times > Movies > Pedro de Cordoba
 nytimes.com – News clippings

1881 births
1950 deaths
American male stage actors
American male silent film actors
American male radio actors
American male film actors
Male actors from New York City
American people of Cuban descent
American people of French descent
Burials at Holy Cross Cemetery, Culver City
20th-century American male actors
American Roman Catholics
Hispanic and Latino American male actors